A by-election was held for the New South Wales Legislative Assembly electorate of Kiama on 1 February 1986 because of the resignation of Labor Party member Bill Knott.

By-elections for the seats of Cabramatta and Canterbury were held on the same day.

Dates

Results

Labor Party member Bill Knott resigned.

See also
Electoral results for the district of Kiama
List of New South Wales state by-elections

References

1986 elections in Australia
New South Wales state by-elections
1980s in New South Wales